Arakkal Kingdom was a Muslim kingdom in Kannur town in Kannur district, in the state of Kerala, South India. The king was called Ali Raja and the ruling queen was called Arakkal Beevi. Arakkal kingdom included little more than the Cannanore town and the southern Laccadive Islands (Agatti, Kavaratti, Androth and Kalpeni, as well as Minicoy), originally leased from the Kolattiri. The royal family is said to be originally a branch of the Kolattiri, descended from a princess of that family who converted to Islam. They owed allegiance to the Kolattiri rulers, whose ministers they had been at one time. The rulers followed the Marumakkathayam system of matrilineal inheritance, a system that is unique to a section of Hindus of Kerala. Under Marumakkathayam, the succession passes to the male offspring of its female members, in other words from a man to his sister's son and so forth. As the only Muslim rulers in Malabar, they saw the rise of Hyder Ali, de facto ruler of the Mysore Sultanate as the opportunity to increase their own power at the expense of Chirakkal, and invited him to invade Kerala.

The Bibi received no special treatment after the treaties of Srirangapatam, and settlement negotiations were long and difficult but she finally signed an agreement in 1796 that guaranteed continued possession of the city of Cannanore and the Laccadive Islands but deprived her of any claim to sovereignty. Yet, as late as 1864, the Bibi of Cannanore was included in an official list of "native sovereigns and chiefs" as being entitled to a seven-gun salute. Because of the outbreak of the war with France shortly after the 1796 agreement, as well as other considerations, the Laccadive Islands remained unnoticed and the Bibi continued to rule them with no restrictions. The islands were misgoverned throughout the 19th century, and the British Government had to assume their administration at least twice, from 1854 to 1861, and again (permanently as it turned out) in 1875. In 1905, in exchange for the remission of overdue tribute, the payment of an annual pension to the head of the family, and the title of Sultan, the Ali Raja at last agreed to cede all rights, whether as sovereign or tenant, to the Laccadive Islands, including Minicoy, which the family claimed as their private property.

The king's palace, which he purchased from the Dutch in 1663, was named Arakkal Palace after the ruling dynasty.

Origins

 
As per legend, the last ruler of the Chera Empire, Rama Varma Kulashekhara Perumal, is said to have been converted to Islam at the hands of Malik Bin Dinar, an Islamic missionary. Perumal along with Malik Deenar came from Mahodyapuram (Old name of Kodungallur -The capital of the Chera Empire) to Thalassery, to visit Perumal's sister and nephew residing there. Perumal's sister Sridevi and nephew Mabeli were residing in a place called Dharmadam north of Thalassery. The relics of their fort is located in the vicinity of Govt. Brennan College, Thalassery. Mabeli was converted to Islam and he accepted the name Muhammad Ali, who later became the first Arakkal Ali Raja.
 According to folklore, Cheraman Perumal went to Mecca from an erstwhile province named Poya Nadu(Governed by feudal governors named Randuthara Achanmar. The region comprises Edakkad, Anjarakkandy, Mavilayi etc.) now in Kannur district. Malik Deenar built a mosque in Madayi north of Kannur, the third oldest mosque in Kerala.

Perumal's nephew Mabeli was an Arayankulangara Nair, and hence the Nair matrilineal system is observed by the Arakkal royal family. His wife was the daughter of Kolathiri, and they later came to be known as Arakkal Beevi. Muhammad Ali continued in the service of the Kolathiris even after his conversion, and his successors known as the Mammali Kidavus were the hereditary Padanairs of the Kolathiri. Around this time, many Muslim merchant families became financially influential in the Malabar region.  When the Arakkal family took control of Laccadives, they achieved near-royal status.

Another legend is that the daughter of Chirakkal Raja began to drown while bathing in the Chirakkal kulam (pond). Her friends cried and shouted but were unable to rescue her. Muhammad Ali heard the shouting and came to find out what was wrong. He recognized the girl drowning in the pond as the princess, but was hesitant about saving her because of untouchability and if a lower-caste person touched an upper-caste person it was considered a sin, possibly punishable by death. However, he rescued her and gave her his dhoti to cover the princess. When the news reached the Chirakkal Raja, he called his daughter and Muhammad Ali. At that time, if a man gave a pudava (a long cloth used for covering the body) to an unmarried woman, they were considered married. The scholars of the court told the Raja that since his daughter was touched by a Muslim, she was no longer allowed to enter the palace. However, the man had given her his pudava so she was married to him as well. As per the custom the Raja had no other choice but to give his daughter to Muhammad Ali. The area given to Muhammad Ali was known as Arakkal and his family was called the Arakkal family.

The British Military was very eager to make Dharmadam as their base and built a fort there. This small island village was strategically more secure than any surrounding place as it is a hilly island, however, it was governed by Arakkal kingdom, being the first Ali Raja's hometown. Arakkal kingdom was so powerful at that time as an ally of Mysore, even to defy the British. British East India Company was not allowed by the Arakkal kingdom to build a military garrison in Dharmadam. So they were forced to build their base in Thalassery where there was a strong presence of French forces stationed few kilometers away in Mahé.

Location
The palace is three kilometers from Kannur, Kerala, India, in what is now called Kannur town. The Arakkal family was the only Muslim royal family in Kerala.

Ali Rajas and Arakkal Beevis

The Arakkal family followed a matriarchal system of descent: the eldest member of the family, whether male or female, became its head and ruler. While male rulers were called Ali Rajah, female rulers were known as Arakkal Beevis.

Hameed Hussain Koyamma Ali Raja, becomes the new head of the Arakkal royal family on 2nd Dec 2021 .

History
There had been considerable trade relations between Middle East and Malabar Coast even before the time of Muhammad (c. 570 - 632 AD). Muslim tombstones with ancient dates, short inscriptions in medieval mosques, and rare Arab coin collections are the major sources of early Muslim presence on the Malabar Coast. Islam arrived in Kerala, a part of the larger Indian Ocean rim, via spice and silk traders from the Middle East. Historians do not rule out the possibility of Islam being introduced to Kerala as early as the seventh century CE. Notable has been the occurrence of Cheraman Perumal Tajuddin, the Hindu King that moved to Arabia from Dharmadom near Kannur to meet Muhammad and converted to Islam. According to the Legend of Cheraman Perumals, the first Indian mosque was built in 624 AD at Kodungallur with the mandate of the last the ruler (the Cheraman Perumal) of Chera dynasty, who converted to Islam during the lifetime of Muhammad (c. 570–632). According to Qissat Shakarwati Farmad, the Masjids at Kodungallur, Kollam, Madayi, Barkur, Mangalore, Kasaragod, Kannur, Dharmadam, Panthalayini, and Chaliyam, were built during the era of Malik Dinar, and they are among the oldest Masjids in the Indian subcontinent. It is believed that Malik Dinar died at Thalangara in Kasaragod town. According to popular tradition, Islam was brought to Lakshadweep islands, situated just to the west of Malabar Coast, by Ubaidullah in 661 CE. His grave is believed to be located on the island of Andrott. The Arabic inscription on a copper slab within the Madayi Mosque in Kannur records its foundation year as 1124 CE.

Thus history of Muslims in Kerala is closely intertwined with the history of Muslims in the nearby Laccadives islands.  Kerala's only Muslim kingdom was Kannur's Arakkal family.  Historians however, disagree about the time period of Arakkal rulers.  They see the Arakkal kings come to power in the 16th or 17th century.

By 1909, Arakkal rulers had lost Kannur and the Cannanore Cantonment. By 1911, there was a further decline with the loss of chenkol (sceptre) and udaval (sword). They allied and clashed with the Portuguese, the Dutch, the French and the British.  The British played the biggest part in removing all vestiges of titles and power from the Arakkal rulers.  One of the last kings, Abdu Rahiman Ali Raja (1881–1946), was active in helping his subjects.  The last ruler was Ali Raja Mariumma Beevi Thangal. After her rule, the family broke up.

During the time of the Samuthiries the Muslims of Kerala played a major role in the local army and navy, as well as acting as ambassadors to Arabia and China. Even before this period they had settlements in Perumathura, Thakkala, Thengapattanam, Poovar and Thiruvankottu. Muslims from Pandi Desham migrated to trade with Aruvithura, Kanjirappalli, Mundakayam, Peruvanthanam, Muvattupuzha and Vandiperiyar in and around Kottayam district of Kerala.  In the 17th century, trade links were established with places like Kayamkulam and Alappuzha in the west. It was during the time of Samuthiris that the title of Marakkar was created. Muslim influence reached its peak at the time of Kunjali Marakkar, the fourth in the line.

Relations with the Kingdom of Mysore
After being appointed the Naval Chief of Hyder Ali's army, Ali Raja Kunhi Amsa II's first course of action was to capture the unfortunate Sultan of the Maldives Hasan 'Izz ud-din and present him to Hyder Ali after having gouged out his eyes, he had also defeated Sultan Muhammad Imaduddin III of the Maldives, who died in captivity.

Foreign relations of the Arakkal
In the year 1777 a letter was sent to the Ottomans by Ali Raja Kunhi Amsa II, a dedicated ally of Hyder Ali of the Sultanate of Mysore and mentioned how the region received Ottoman assistance two hundred and forty years ago by Hadim Suleiman Pasha. Ali Raja Kunhi Amsa II also stated that the dynasty had been fighting for its authority for the last forty years against various hostile forces and also requested assistance against the British East India Company, two years later in 1780 another letter was sent by his sister Ali Raja Bibi Junumabe II requesting urgent assistance against Portuguese and British encroachments during the Second Anglo-Mysore War.

Arakkal Museum

The Durbar Hall section of the Arakkalkettu (Arakkal Palace) has been converted into a museum housing artifacts from the times of the Arakkal dynasty. The work was carried out by the Government of Kerala at a cost of Rs. 9,000,000. The museum opened in July 2005.

The Arakkalkettu is owned by the Arakkal Trust, which includes some members Arakkal royal family. The government had taken a keen interest in preserving the heritage of the Arakkal Family, which had played a prominent role in the history of Malabar.  A nominal entry fee is charged by the Arakkal Trust.

Reigning Arakkal rajas and Arakkal beevis
Ali Raja Ali (1545–1591)
Ali Raja Abubakar I (1591–1607)
Ali Raja Abubakar II (1607–1610)
Ali Raja Muhammad Ali I (1610–1647)
Ali Raja Muhammad Ali II (1647–1655)
Ali Raja Kamal (1655–1656)
Ali Raja Muhammad Ali III (1656–1691)
Ali Raja Ali II (1691–1704)
Ali Raja Kunhi Amsa I (1704–1720)
Ali Raja Muhammad Ali IV (1720–1728)
Ali Raja Bibi Harrabichi Kadavube (1728–1732)
Ali Raja Bibi Junumabe I (1732–1745)
Ali Raja Kunhi Amsa II (1745–1777)
Ali Raja Bibi Junumabe II (1777–1819)

See also
 Arakkalkettu

References

History of Kannur district
Feudal states of Kerala
1545 establishments in India